A Carnot cycle is an ideal thermodynamic cycle proposed by French physicist Sadi Carnot in 1824 and expanded upon by others in the 1830s and 1840s. By Carnot's theorem, it provides an upper limit on the efficiency of any classical thermodynamic engine during the conversion of heat into work, or conversely, the efficiency of a refrigeration system in creating a temperature difference through the application of work to the system.

The cycle is reversible, and there is no generation of entropy. (In other words, entropy is conserved; entropy is only transferred between the thermal reservoirs and the system without gain or loss of it.) When work is applied to the system, heat moves from the cold to hot reservoir (heat pump or refrigeration). When heat moves from the hot to the cold reservoir, the system applies work to the environment.

Stages

A Carnot cycle as an idealized thermodynamic cycle performed by a heat engine (Carnot heat engine) consists of the following steps.

In this case, since it is a reversible thermodynamic cycle (no net change in the system and its surroundings per cycle)

or,

The pressure–volume graph 
When a Carnot cycle is plotted on a pressure–volume diagram, the isothermal stages follow the isotherm lines for the working fluid, the adiabatic stages move between isotherms, and the area bounded by the complete cycle path represents the total work that can be done during one cycle. From point 1 to 2 and point 3 to 4 the temperature is constant (isothermal process). Heat transfer from point 4 to 1 and point 2 to 3 are equal to zero (adiabatic process).

Properties and significance

The temperature–entropy diagram 

The behavior of a Carnot engine or refrigerator is best understood by using a temperature–entropy diagram (T–S diagram), in which the thermodynamic state is specified by a point on a graph with entropy (S) as the horizontal axis and temperature (T) as the vertical axis. For a simple closed system (control mass analysis), any point on the graph represents a particular state of the system. A thermodynamic process is represented by a curve connecting an initial state (A) and a final state (B). The area under the curve is:

which is the amount heat transferred in the process. If the process moves the system to greater entropy, the area under the curve is the amount of heat absorbed by the system in that process; otherwise, it is the amount of heat removed from or leaving from the system. For any cyclic process, there is an upper portion of the cycle and a lower portion. In T-S diagrams for a clockwise cycle, the area under the upper portion will be the energy absorbed by the system during the cycle, while the area under the lower portion will be the energy removed from the system during the cycle. The area inside the cycle is then the difference between the two (the absorbed net heat energy), but since the internal energy of the system must have returned to its initial value, this difference must be the amount of work done by the system per cycle.

Since dU is an exact differential, its integral over any closed loop is zero and it follows that the area inside the loop on a T–S diagram is equal to the total work performed by the system on the surroundings if the loop is traversed in a clockwise direction, and is equal to the total work done on the system by the surroundings as the loop is traversed in a counterclockwise direction.

The Carnot cycle 

Evaluation of the above integral is particularly simple for a Carnot cycle. The amount of energy transferred as work is

The total amount of heat transferred from the hot reservoir to the system (in the isothermal expansion) will be

and the total amount of heat transferred from the system to the cold reservoir (in the isothermal compression) will be

Due to energy conservation, the net heat transferred, is equal to the work performed

The efficiency  is defined to be:

where
  is the work done by the system (energy exiting the system as work),
  < 0 is the heat taken from the system (heat energy leaving the system),
  > 0 is the heat put into the system (heat energy entering the system),
   is the absolute temperature of the cold reservoir, and
  is the absolute temperature of the hot reservoir.
  is the maximum system entropy
  is the minimum system entropy

This is the Carnot heat engine working efficiency definition as the fraction of the work done by the system to the thermal energy received by the system from the hot reservoir per cycle. This thermal energy is the cycle initiator.

Reversed Carnot cycle 

A Carnot heat-engine cycle described is a totally reversible cycle. That is, all the processes that compose it can be reversed, in which case it becomes the Carnot heat pump and refrigeration cycle. This time, the cycle remains exactly the same except that the directions of any heat and work interactions are reversed. Heat is absorbed from the low-temperature reservoir, heat is rejected to a high-temperature reservoir, and a work input is required to accomplish all this. The P–V diagram of the reversed Carnot cycle is the same as for the Carnot heat-engine cycle except that the directions of the processes are reversed.

Carnot's theorem

Carnot's theorem is a formal statement of this fact: No engine operating between two heat reservoirs can be more efficient than a Carnot engine operating between those same reservoirs. Thus, Equation  gives the maximum efficiency possible for any engine using the corresponding temperatures. A corollary to Carnot's theorem states that: All reversible engines operating between the same heat reservoirs are equally efficient. Rearranging the right side of the equation gives what may be a more easily understood form of the equation, namely that the theoretical maximum efficiency of a heat engine equals the difference in temperature between the hot and cold reservoir divided by the absolute temperature of the hot reservoir. Looking at this formula an interesting fact becomes apparent: Lowering the temperature of the cold reservoir will have more effect on the ceiling efficiency of a heat engine than raising the temperature of the hot reservoir by the same amount. In the real world, this may be difficult to achieve since the cold reservoir is often an existing ambient temperature.

In other words, the maximum efficiency is achieved if and only if entropy does not change per cycle. An entropy change per cycle is made, for example, if there is friction leading to dissipation of work into heat. In that case, the cycle is not reversible and the Clausius theorem becomes an inequality rather than an equality. Otherwise, since entropy is a state function, the required dumping of heat into the environment to dispose of excess entropy leads to a (minimal) reduction in efficiency. So Equation  gives the efficiency of any reversible heat engine.

In mesoscopic heat engines, work per cycle of operation in general fluctuates due to thermal noise. If the cycle is performed quasi-statically, the fluctuations vanish even on the mesoscale. However, if the cycle is performed faster than the relaxation time of the working medium, the fluctuations of work are inevitable. Nevertheless, when work and heat fluctuations are counted, an exact equality relates the exponential average of work performed by any heat engine to the heat transfer from the hotter heat bath.

Efficiency of real heat engines

Carnot realized that, in reality, it is not possible to build a thermodynamically reversible engine.  So, real heat engines are even less efficient than indicated by Equation . In addition, real engines that operate along the Carnot cycle style (isothermal expansion / isentropic expansion / isothermal compression / isentropic compression) are rare. Nevertheless, Equation  is extremely useful for determining the maximum efficiency that could ever be expected for a given set of thermal reservoirs.

Although Carnot's cycle is an idealization, Equation  as the expression of the Carnot efficiency is still useful. Consider the average temperatures,

at which the first integral is over a part of a cycle where heat goes into the system and the second integral is over a cycle part where heat goes out from the system. Then, replace TH and TC in Equation  by 〈TH〉 and 〈TC〉, respectively, to estimate the efficiency a heat engine.

For the Carnot cycle, or its equivalent, the average value 〈TH〉 will equal the highest temperature available, namely TH, and 〈TC〉 the lowest, namely TC. For other less efficient thermodynamic cycles, 〈TH〉 will be lower than TH, and 〈TC〉 will be higher than TC. This can help illustrate, for example, why a reheater or a regenerator can improve the thermal efficiency of steam power plants and why the thermal efficiency of combined-cycle power plants (which incorporate gas turbines operating at even higher temperatures) exceeds that of conventional steam plants. The first prototype of the diesel engine was based on the Carnot cycle.

Carnot heat engine as an impractical macroscopic construct 
A Carnot heat engine is a heat engine performing a Carnot cycle, and its realization on a macroscopic scale is impractical. For example, for the isothermal expansion part of the Carnot cycle, the following conditions must be satisfied simultaneously at every step in the expansion:

 The hot reservoir temperature TH is infinitesimally higher than the system gas temperature T so heat flow (energy transfer) from the hot reservoir to the gas is made without increasing T (via infinitesimal work on the surroundings by the gas as another energy transfer); if TH is significantly higher than T, then T may be not uniform through the gas so the system would deviate from thermal equilibrium as well as not being a reversible process (i.e. not a Carnot cycle) or T might increase noticeably so it would not be an isothermal process.
 The force externally applied on the piston (opposite to the internal force on the piston by the gas) needs to be infinitesimally reduced somehow. Without this external assistance, it would not be possible to follow a gas PV (Pressure-Volume) curve downward at a constant T since following this curve means that the gas-to-piston force decreases (P decreases) as the volume expands (the piston moves outward). If this assistance is so strong that the volume expansion is significant, the system may deviate from thermal equilibrium as well as not being a reversible process (i.e. not a Carnot cycle).

These (and other) "infinitesimal" requirements make the Carnot cycle take an infinite amount of time. Other practical requirements that make the Carnot cycle hard to realize (e.g., fine control of the gas, thermal contact with the surroundings including high and low temperature reservoirs), so the Carnot engine should be thought as the theoretical limit of macroscopic scale heat engines rather than a practical device that could ever be built.

See also
 Carnot heat engine
 Reversible process (thermodynamics)

References
Notes

Sources
 Carnot, Sadi, Reflections on the Motive Power of Fire
 Ewing, J. A. (1910) The Steam-Engine and Other Engines edition 3, page 62, via Internet Archive
 
 
 
  American Institute of Physics, 2011. . Abstract at: .

External links
Hyperphysics article on the Carnot cycle.
 S. M. Blinder Carnot Cycle on Ideal Gas powered by Wolfram Mathematica

Thermodynamic cycles